Merck Millipore was the brand used by Merck Group's (not US-based Merck & Co.) global life science business until 2015 when the company re-branded. It was formed when Merck acquired the Millipore Corporation in 2010. Merck is a supplier to the life science industry. The Millipore Corporation was founded in 1954, and listed among the S&P 500 since the early 1990s, as an international biosciences company which makes micrometer pore-size filters and tests. In 2015, Merck acquired Sigma-Aldrich and merged it with Merck Millipore. In the United States and Canada, the life science business is now known as MilliporeSigma.

History

Founding
In the early 1950s, Lovell Corporation won a contract from the U.S. Army Chemical Engineers to develop and manufacture membrane filtering devices used to separate the molecular components of fluid samples. When the membranes were declassified in 1953 and offered for commercial use, Jack Bush, son of Vannevar Bush and a Lovell employee, bought the company's technology for $200,000 and established the Millipore Filter Company. Bush coined the word millipore to refer to the numerous tiny openings in the microporous membrane product. The term "millipore", originally a trademark, has since come into generic use, referring to any of several filters, made from cellulose acetate membranes, capable of removing very small particles. Later the company changed its name to Millipore Corporation to reflect its growing range of products. In 2010, Merck KGaA the world's oldest chemical and pharmaceutical company, acquired Millipore Corporation to form EMD Millipore.

Filters
By 1959, Millipore made porous membrane filters of cellulose esters or other materials which resembled paper in sheet form, and were brittle when dry but friable when wet. Filters consisted of nitrocellulose or polycarbonate membrane nucleopore filters ranging from pore size of 0.2 μm (micrometer) to 20 µm. Modern filters are polyvinylidene fluoride and/or polypropylene based.

Growth
By 1970, Millipore had established subsidiaries in seven countries. The company opened manufacturing plants in Jaffrey, New Hampshire; Molsheim, France; Cork, Ireland; and other locations. Millipore's 2006 acquisition of Serologicals Corporation provided entry to high-growth markets for drug discovery products and services, antibodies, cell biology reagents, and stem cell research. As of the late 2000s, Millipore was the only company providing both upstream cell culture and downstream separations offerings for biopharmaceutical production.

Timeline

1950s
 1954: Jack Bush purchases the rights to a new membrane-production process developed by Lovell Chemical Company. Millipore Filter Corporation is incorporated and Bush becomes president, and later chairman
 1955: Millipore receives its first patent, for microporous nylon film invented by Stanley Lovell and Jack Bush

1960s
 1964: opens first subsidiary, in France
 1967: introduces the Super-Q water purification system
 1967: establishes German subsidiary
 1968: establishes Japanese subsidiary 
 1968: introduces Pellicon cassette product, for purifying biotherapeutics

1970s
 1971: introduces the original Millex syringe filter—the first disposable syringe filter
 1972: opens subsidiary in Spain
 1972: opens a manufacturing plant in Jaffrey, New Hampshire. 
 1973: starts manufacturing in Molsheim, France
 1973: introduces the Milli-Q water purification system, the first lab-scale ultrapure water system
 1978: reaches $100 million revenue
 1978: opens manufacturing plant in Danvers, Massachusetts
 1979: acquires Waters Associates Inc., a producer of chromatographic media and High-performance liquid chromatography instrumentation

1980s
 1980: introduces low-protein binding Durapore polyvinylidene fluoride membrane
 1987: listed on the New York Stock Exchange
 1987: achieves $500 million revenue
 1988: opens membrane manufacturing plant in Cork, Ireland

1990s
 1994: divests its Waters Chromatography Division to focus on its membrane business
 1996: acquires Amicon separation sciences business from W. R. Grace and Company
 1997: acquires Tylan General, expanding its gas purification offerings for the microelectronics industry
 1999: acquires Bioprocessing Limited, a developer and manufacturer of chromatography

2000s
 2001: spins off its Microelectronics Division (30% of its revenue), that becomes Mykrolis, which will merge with Entegris in 2005
 2002: opens Biopharmaceutical Technology Center in Billerica, Massachusetts 
 2005: acquires MicroSafe, a European contract testing laboratory
 2005: acquires NovAseptic, supplier of aseptically designed components for biotech and pharmaceutical production
 2005: forms alliance with Gen-Probe to develop, manufacture and commercialize products for rapid microbiological and virus monitoring
 2006: acquires Newport Bio Systems, a maker of process containers and systems used in biopharmaceutical production
 2006: acquires Serologicals Corporation (including the companies Chemicon, Upstate, Linco, and Celliance), expanding its drug discovery and development footprint
 2006: opens a new Research and Development Center in Bedford, Massachusetts
 2007: launches its new brand
 2008: expands drug discovery and development facility in St. Charles, Missouri
 2008: opens membrane casting manufacturing facility in Carrigtwohill, County Cork, Ireland
 2009: acquires Guava Technologies, a provider of bench top cell analysis systems
 2009: opens Biomanufacturing Sciences and Training Center in Singapore
 2009: acquires BioAnaLab, a European-based firm specializing in the analysis of biologic drugs and vaccines
 2010: Merck KGaA acquires Millipore, which will be part of the EMD Group
 2015: Merck completes $17 billion acquisition of Sigma-Aldrich, combining EMD Millipore and Sigma-Aldrich to create life science company MilliporeSigma

Financial history
Millipore Corporation had been publicly traded on the OTC, or NASDAQ, exchange where it had paid a cash dividend to shareholders every year since 1966. In 1987 Millipore Corporation moved from the NASDAQ exchange to the New York Stock Exchange, where it traded under the ticker symbol MIL. Millipore Corporation was on the S&P 500 list of the largest publicly traded companies in the United States until it was acquired by Merck kGaA in 2010. The deal was valued at approximately EUR 5.3 billion (US$7.2 billion). Merck KGaA is not associated with Merck & Co., although the two companies stem from the same parent company.

References

Sources
 https://cen.acs.org/articles/93/web/2015/11/merck-kgaa-completes-sigma-aldrich-acquisition.html

External links
 Millipore Corporation web site
 http://www.emdmillipore.com/US/en

 

1954 establishments in Massachusetts
Companies based in Burlington, Massachusetts
Companies formerly listed on the Nasdaq
Companies formerly listed on the New York Stock Exchange
Life sciences industry
Life science companies based in Massachusetts
Merck Group
Technology companies established in 1954